Phillip Darrell Jones (born 15 April 1955) is a Norfolk Island international lawn bowler.

He was born in Young, New South Wales and represented Norfolk Island in the 2014 Commonwealth Games.

He was selected as part of the Norfolk Island team for the 2018 Commonwealth Games on the Gold Coast in Queensland where he took a bronze medal in the Triples with Hadyn Evans and Ryan Dixon.

References

1955 births
Living people
Bowls players at the 2014 Commonwealth Games
Bowls players at the 2018 Commonwealth Games
Commonwealth Games medallists in lawn bowls
Norfolk Island sportspeople
Australian male bowls players
Commonwealth Games bronze medallists for Norfolk Island
Norfolk Island bowls players
People from Young, New South Wales
Sportsmen from New South Wales
Medallists at the 2018 Commonwealth Games